Kaukėnas is a Lithuanian language surname. Notable people with the surname include:

Rimantas Kaukėnas (born 1977), Lithuanian basketball player
Tomas Kaukėnas (born 1990), Lithuanian biathlete

Lithuanian-language surnames